KCOG (1400 AM) is a radio station broadcasting a Hot AC format. The station is licensed to serve the community of Centerville, Iowa, United States.  The station is owned by KCOG, Inc.

Translator
KCOG programming is also carried on a broadcast translator station to extend or improve the coverage area of the station.

References

External links

COG
Radio stations established in 1949
Hot adult contemporary radio stations in the United States
1949 establishments in Iowa